Milind Deora (born 4 December 1976) is an Indian politician and former Union Minister of State (MoS) for Communications & Information Technology and Shipping. He was a Member of the 15th Lok Sabha, the lower house of Parliament of India, from the Mumbai South constituency and also President of Mumbai regional congress committee.

He currently serves as a member of Dean’s Advisory Board at Frederick S. Pardee School of Global Studies in Boston University. Deora was one of the youngest members of the 15th Lok Sabha. He became MP at the age of 27. He won the 2004 elections with a margin of 10,000 votes against BJP's Jaywantiben Mehta. In the 2009 Lok Sabha election, Deora was again elected from Mumbai South Constituency, this time by a margin of 1,12,682 votes.
Milind Deora was inducted in the Union Government of India as the Minister of State for Communications and Information Technology in 2011.

Early life
Deora was born in Bombay (present-day Mumbai) to veteran politician Murli Deora, who was a Member of Parliament for the same constituency between 1984 and 1996, and once again in 1998 in the 12th Lok Sabha. Deora studied at  Cathedral and John Connon School, Sydenham College. He earned Bachelor of Business Administration from Questrom School of Business at Boston University.

Legislative career
Milind Deora was one of the youngest members of the 14th Lok Sabha.

Member of Parliament (2004-09)
Milind Deora was elected to the 14th Lok Sabha. He won the 2004 elections with a margin of 10,000 votes against BJP's Jaywantiben Mehta.  He was a member of the Standing Committee on Defence along with the Consultative Committee in the Ministry of Defence in 2004. From 7 August 2006 onwards he was a member of the Consultative Committee in the Ministry of Urban Development.

Soon after being elected, he called for increased central assistance to fund urban infrastructure projects. Under the Jawaharlal Nehru National Urban Renewal Mission, Mumbai and Maharashtra have been among the greatest beneficiaries. After raising the issue in Parliament he obtained twelve-hundred crore (12 billion) rupees for the BMC to completely revamp its Storm Water Drain Project. He also initiated the debate on Right to Information in the Parliament, on behalf of the UPA-1 Government and made use of the MPLADS funds for issues such as public toilets, drainage lines, repairing of roads, and initiating the beautification of destinations including the Marine Drive, the Gateway of India and the Jhaveri Bazar. He persuaded the state government to expedite projects including the Bandra-Worli sea link and the Mumbai Metro and obtained funds from the Central and State government for hospitals including G.T. and J.J.

Member of Parliament (2009-14)
In the 2009 Lok Sabha election, Deora was again elected from Mumbai South Constituency, this time by a margin of 1,12,682 votes. He has an overall 88% attendance in the parliamentary proceedings and has raised 274 questions ranging from Home Affairs  to Finance and from Urban Development to Environment and Forests.
He was a member of the Committee on Information Technology and of the Consultative Committee in the Ministry of Civil Aviation. Since 1 May 2010, he had been a member of the Committee on Estimates.

Union Minister of State for Communications and Information Technology (July 2011 - May 2014)
Through the ministry, Mr.Deora has been committed to activities like strengthening the regulator, providing sufficient e-infrastructure and provide value-for-money services.

Union Minister of State for Shipping (October 2012 - May 2014)

Milind Deora was given this additional charge in October 2012. In an effort to promote the maritime traditions of the state, he proposed to establish a heritage museum and an elevator as part of the Vizhinjam lighthouse tourism project that has been undertaken by the Directorate General of Lighthouses and Lightships (subordinate office under the Ministry of Shipping) in association with the Kerala State Industrial Development Corporation on public-private-participation model.

Resignation as the Mumbai Congress party president 
Following the resignation of Rahul Gandhi and losses in the 2019 Lok Sabha election, Deora resigned as the Mumbai Congress party president. Deora recommended the temporary establishment of a group of three senior leaders to monitor the Mumbai City unit till the Vidhan Sabha elections. He said he will look forward to play a national role to help stabilise the party.

Other Initiatives

Direct Mayor Direct Accountability (DMDA)
The DMDA campaign seeks to empower Mumbai’s mayor with accountability to Mumbai’s voters in order to ensure greater transparency and a more coordinated way to govern Mumbai. This is to be achieved by directly electing your Mayor. His petition to the Chief Minister of Maharashtra has received around 5,000 votes as of now.

Local Body Tax
A delegation of the trading community had met Mr. Milind Deora to forward their grievances to the Chief Minister of Maharashtra. He had met the CM thrice on this issue. Finally, it was announced in a meeting with traders' representatives arranged by Mr. Milind Deora that LBT will not be enforced in Mumbai until there is a consensus between the trading community and the Maharashtra Government.

Tariff Authority for Major Ports (TAMP)
Ever since the announcement of "in-principle" decision to disband the TAMP, Milind Deora stated that the Shipping Ministry is mulling more relaxations to bring about greater parity in pricing at all ports soon.

Google+ Hangout
Deora hosted a live Google+ Hangout about the future of IT and Communication in India on 6 June 2013. The Hangout session was moderated by TV anchor Cyrus Broacha.

Computer Education Program
Milind has been actively pursuing the cause of propagating free job-oriented computer education to economically underprivileged students through NGO Sparsh. He is committed to provide free service to over 100 needy schools in Mumbai covering over 1 lakh students under Public-Private-Partnership. Sparsh educates poor students in computer and IT proficiency and it has computerised hundreds of poor schools in Mumbai.

Youth Parliament 
The Youth Parliament is an annual parliament visit, which exposes students from Mumbai to experience a day in the Indian Parliament in New Delhi during the winter session. Around eighty students from 20 colleges participate in the parliamentary proceedings every year. It is a concept that aims is to give an opportunity for today’s youth to actually experience a behind the scenes look at what a day in Lok-Sabha entails.

Nearly Hundred students from 20 city colleges participated in the parliamentary proceedings at the 'Youth Parliament 2013' event at the BSE Ltd convention hall. Sachin Pilot, Minister of State of Corporate Affairs was the chief guest. The event is the latest in a series of initiatives undertaken by Milind Deora, MP of South Mumbai. During the day's proceeding, various issues such as Direct Benefit transfers, Juvenile Justice Act, Mobile Tower Radiation, Telangana state re-organization, FDI in Retail, Uniform civil code, Fiscal deficit and NRHM were discussed by Mumbai's youth in great detail.

UthSpeak
In October 2013, Deora took the initiative to launch @UthSpeak, an apolitical social media handle on Twitter for the youth to voice their opinions. This platform neither reflects his personal views or party biases, it is completely neutral. The idea is to discuss burning issues affecting the country, dispassionately and objectively one issue at a time, every month.  More importantly it attempts to connect the youth with India’s decision-makers as the suggestions tabled on the handle will culminate in active interactions between Uthspeak and the authorities concerned.

Soccer Talent Hunt
Milind Deora Soccer Championship, an annual football tournament for school students  is organised by the Milind Deora Initiative. This initiative mainly aims to promote a relatively lesser-known sport among the under privileged part of the society. The plan is to extend the talent search in organizing a tournament into a league format for Municipal and Government funded schools in South Mumbai.
In April 2013, Five south Mumbai school boys - Rudolf D'Souza (13), Arfat Ansari (15), Tanaay Shah (15), Uzair Ansari (15) and Praful Kumar (16) were selected after their display in the Milind Deora soccer championships by the club's coaches for a 21-day coaching stint with English Premier League team at Queens Park Rangers F.C. in London.

In October 2013, Bollywood Actor Salman Khan with South Mumbai MP Milind Deora, Aditya Mittal, son of Laxmi Mittal commemorated the 5th South Mumbai- Milind Deora Junior Soccer Challenger, organised in association with Queens Park Rangers F.C. Over 5000 kids(4250 from Municipal Schools) from over 137 schools, including municipal and government aided ones, participated in this Challenger, which is India’s largest community football tournament.

Independent Stands

Adarsh Scam 
The 37-year-old Congress member of Parliament from south Mumbai, advised the Chavan-led Maharashtra government to take the opposition parties on board. He said this is necessary because members of almost all political parties are involved in the Adarsh scam. On 25 December 2013, he had tweeted: "If the Adarsh report raises questions we should investigate (agnostic of party or bureaucracy), answer them and not be hush."

Rejection of Ordinance protecting convicted MLAs/MPs
Adding woes for the UPA government, which is already facing wrath of the Opposition and the public for passing an ordinance on convicted legislators, Congress leader and Minister of State Milind Deora has come out in the open against it. He tweeted that the ordinance could endanger the already eroding public faith in democracy. "Legalities aside allowing convicted MPs/MLAs 2 retain seats in the midst of an appeal can endanger the already eroding public faith in democracy," Deora tweeted.

Personal life

On 9 November 2008, Deora married Pooja Shetty in Mumbai. She heads the film production company Walk Water Media and is the daughter of film producer Manmohan Shetty, former Adlabs chairman, who established Walkwater Media Ltd in 2007. His brother Mukul is a disc jockey. Milind is a blues guitarist having several performances to his credit. In January 2019, accepting an invitation by Sharon Prabhakar to come on stage, he played guitar during her performance.

Deora has also inspired Abhishek Bachchan, who played a young politician in the 2009 film Paa. Bachchan said: "I modeled my look after Sachin Pilot and Milind Deora in the film. There were no special effects taken for my look in the movie because we wanted to keep the character as normal as possible."

Member of Committee
Deora was member of the following Committees till he assumed the office of Minister of State in July 2011.

 Standing Committee, Ministry of Defence (India)
 Consultative Committee, Ministry of Defence (India)
 Consultative Committee, Ministry of Urban Development (India)
 Committee on Information Technology
 Consultative Committee, Ministry of Civil Aviation (India)
 Committee on Estimates

References

External links
 Milind Deora Profile 

|-

|-

1976 births
Living people
Indian National Congress politicians from Maharashtra
Rajasthani people
India MPs 2004–2009
India MPs 2009–2014
Boston University School of Management alumni
Politicians from Mumbai
Lok Sabha members from Maharashtra
United Progressive Alliance candidates in the 2014 Indian general election
Cathedral and John Connon School alumni

mr:मुरली देवडा